Undeclared is an American sitcom created by Judd Apatow, which aired on Fox during the 2001–02 season. The show has developed a cult following, and in 2012, Entertainment Weekly listed it at #16 in the "25 Best Cult TV Shows from the Past 25 Years".

Premise 
The half-hour comedy was Judd Apatow's follow-up to an earlier television series he worked on, Freaks and Geeks, which also lasted for one season. Undeclared centers on a group of college freshmen at the fictional University of Northeastern California. Unlike Freaks and Geeks, it is set contemporaneously (early 2000s) rather than the early 1980s.

Characters

Main

Recurring
 Perry Madison (Jarrett Grode), bland, sarcastic dorm-mate who can DJ and free-style rap. (12 episodes)
 Eric (Jason Segel), Lizzie's obsessive ex-boyfriend whom she breaks up with after sleeping with Steven. Eric had been dating Lizzie since she was in high school, and he is several years older than she is. Eric works as the manager of a copy shop. (7 episodes)
 Adam (Leroy Adams), student who lives on the gang's floor. (8 episodes)
 P.B. (P.B. Smiley), student who lives on the gang's floor. (6 episodes)
 Trent (Jim Brooks), student who lives on the gang's floor. (4 episodes)
 Lucien (Kevin Rankin), nerdy RA on the gang's floor who has an obsession with Hillary the RA. (4 episodes)
 Hillary (Amy Poehler), the head RA who hits on Lloyd; and at one point, dates Hal. (2 episodes)
 Luke (Kevin Hart), a religious student on campus who temporarily converts Steven to Christianity. (3 episodes)
 Greg (David Krumholtz), Eric's close friend and co-worker at the copy shop. (2 episodes)
 Eugene (Kyle Gass), Eric's other close friend and co-worker at the copy shop. (2 episodes)
 Mr. Burundi (Gerry Bednob), boss at the school cafeteria where Steven and Marshall work. (2 episodes)
 Kelly (Busy Philipps), an attractive tour guide on campus who Ron develops a crush on and later begins dating. (2 episodes)
 Susuki (Joanne Cho), Tina's roommate, whose constant violin practice annoys Tina. (2 episodes)

Guests and cameos

Numerous actors from Freaks and Geeks appeared on Undeclared portraying new characters, including Rogen, Segel, Levine, Starr, Phillips, and Melnick, among several others.

Broadcast

Episodes
When first shown on network television, many episodes were aired out of order, much to Apatow's dismay. When originally released on DVD, the episodes were presented in their production order, which was a mistake according to Apatow. However, newer versions of the DVD present the episodes in the correct chronological order, restoring all storylines and character developments. In addition, an alternate version of the second episode, titled "Full Bluntal Nugety" is included on the DVD release of the series.

Planned storylines
The DVD contains the script to an unproduced episode, "Lloyd's Rampage" (written by Lewis Morton), which was written for the show's second season. It revolves around Lloyd getting into a fight with Kieran, the star student of his acting class, and deciding that he wants to experience real life. So, Steven and Lloyd go to a bar and end up in a fight with some working-class men, which impresses Kieran when Lloyd tells him about it. A subplot revolves around Marshall getting extremely drunk and throwing up in a bar. When he is throwing up, Perry takes a picture and video, and makes T-shirts and posters and puts them around campus. Marshall is embarrassed at first, but he is glad when he finds out about all of the attention that he gets as "Puke Dude". Unfortunately for him, this doesn't last long when everyone forgets about him after another student defecates in his pants in the library. Perry's last name is revealed to be Madison in this episode. The role of Kieran was written for That '70s Show star Topher Grace, but he never appeared in the episode because of a dispute between Apatow and That '70s Show co-creator Mark Brazill.

During a question-and-answer session, Judd Apatow stated that if the series had been picked up for a second season, there would have been an episode titled "Eric's Birthday" in which Lizzie and Steven would go to the birthday party mentioned in episode "Eric's POV". Linda Cardellini of Freaks and Geeks would have played his new girlfriend. In the episode, Eric would have had a cake with a picture of him and his new girlfriend printed on it. Lizzie would have been given the piece with Eric's new girlfriend's face. At the time, Segel and Cardellini were dating.

Syndication
In June 2010, it was announced that the Independent Film Channel had acquired the rights to air both Undeclared and Freaks and Geeks. Undeclared premiered on IFC on November 5, 2010. Both Undeclared and Freaks and Geeks began rerunning on the TeenNick network on June 13, 2011. Netflix also had Undeclared (in the past) and had the episodes in their original chronological order.

Home media
On August 16, 2005, Shout! Factory and DreamWorks Home Entertainment released the complete series of Undeclared on DVD in Region 1. The four-disc boxed set contains all 17 episodes, including an unaired episode and a bonus director's cut.

According to Apatow, the producers were unable to get clearance for all the music in the series (not being able to use about 10 songs). Since the uncleared songs were considered to not play a significant role in the series, they were switched with a suitable substitute.

Reception

Critical reception
Undeclared received critical acclaim from television critics. On Metacritic, the series earned a score of 85 out of 100, based on 24 reviews, indicating "universal acclaim". On Rotten Tomatoes, it has an approval rating of 93% with an average score of 8.18/10 based on reviews from 30 critics. The website's critical consensus reads, "Undeclared lives in the shadow of its Apatow-produced predecessor but still delivers an insightful and sweet year of self-discovery on campus."

In 2020, Briana Kranich of Screen Rant named Undeclared as one of the 10 Most Underrated Shows Of the Noughties.

Ratings 
The show averaged 7.3 million viewers and was #93 in the rankings during its only season.

References

External links 

 

2001 American television series debuts
2002 American television series endings
2000s American college television series
2000s American sex comedy television series
2000s American single-camera sitcoms
2000s American teen sitcoms
English-language television shows
Fox Broadcasting Company original programming
Television series about teenagers
Television series by Apatow Productions
Television series by DreamWorks Television
Television series created by Judd Apatow
Television series set in the 2000s
Television shows set in California